Nikolay Grigoryevich Minkh (March, 28 (15), 1912, Saratov – November 2, 1982, Moscow) was a Soviet composer, conductor, and pianist; one of the founders of Russian jazz and variety music; Honoured Arts Worker of RSFSR (1973).

He finished the Penza Musical Technical School majoring in piano in 1926, and Leningrad Musical Technical School majoring in piano and composition in 1930.

From 1930 he worked as a pianist in various jazz ensembles, including the Jazz Capella, which performed his first compositions. He was also a ballet accompanist in the Leningrad Music Hall.

Nikolay Minkh was the author of numerous popular songs performed by Leonid Utyosov’s band Teajazz. Minkh was a pianist, an accordionist and the music arranger in the band.

In 1940 he became the head of the Variety Orchestra at the Leningrad Radio.

When the war started he volunteered to the frontline. After an injury he headed the orchestra of the Krasnoznamenny Baltic Fleet Theatre (1942–1945). Together with V. Vitlin and L. Kruts he composed and staged the operetta Raskinulos more shiroko (The sea stretches wide) in the blockade of Leningrad in 1942.

In 1966–1982 he headed the Variety Instrumental Music Committee of the Moscow Union of Composers, which became the centre of jazz life in the Russian capital. Minkh is the author of compositions for variety orchestra and more than 150 songs.

External links
  Biography

Russian composers
Russian male composers
Russian pianists
Living people
Male pianists
21st-century Russian conductors (music)
Russian male conductors (music)
21st-century pianists
21st-century Russian male musicians
Year of birth missing (living people)